Amalie Arena (officially stylized as AMALIE Arena) is a multipurpose arena in Tampa, Florida, that has been used for ice hockey, basketball, arena football, concerts, and other events. It is mainly used as the home for the Tampa Bay Lightning of the National Hockey League.

The building opened in 1996 and was originally known as the Ice Palace. In August 2002, the building's naming rights were sold to the St. Petersburg Times, which became the Tampa Bay Times in January 2012; accordingly, the arena was known as the St. Pete Times Forum (2002–2012) and Tampa Bay Times Forum (2012–2014). In September 2014, the arena was renamed Amalie Arena when the naming rights were transferred to Amalie Oil Company.

History

The venue, located in Downtown Tampa's Channelside District, was a secondary location chosen after the failure of Tampa Coliseum Inc. to secure funding to construct an arena on Tampa Sports Authority land near Tampa Stadium. The city of Tampa paid $86 million and the Tampa Bay Lightning paid $53 million for the venue's construction and infrastructure. It opened in 1996 as the Ice Palace. Its first event was a performance by the Royal Hanneford Circus. The first hockey game was the Lightning hosting the New York Rangers, which the Lightning won 5–2.

The arena, built as a new home for the Lightning, was necessary because of the lack of a major league-sized arena in the Tampa Bay Area. The largest existing arenas in the region that were best shaped for hockey were Bayfront Arena in St. Petersburg, the Expo Hall at the Florida State Fairgrounds in Tampa, and the USF Sun Dome on the campus of the University of South Florida in Tampa. However, all of these were either too small for an NHL team to use long term, as their capacities were only 5,800 for Bayfront Arena and 10,425 for the Expo Hall, or would need to undergo extensive renovations to make space for hockey in the case of the Sun Dome (which after renovations would then only have an estimated capacity in the mid-7,000s for hockey, making it too small as well). Prior to the opening of the Ice Palace, the Lightning spent one season at the Expo Hall, and then moved to the Florida Suncoast Dome, which was renamed the "Thunderdome", in St. Petersburg in 1993. The Thunderdome, now Tropicana Field, is currently home to Major League Baseball's Tampa Bay Rays.

The arena is owned by Hillsborough County and leased to the Tampa Sports Authority. The authority leases the arena back to the Lightning, who operate it. The current lease agreement ties the arena to the Lightning ownership.

Naming rights to the arena were sold to the then St. Petersburg Times, the largest local newspaper in the Tampa Bay area. Other entertainment events occasionally held in the Forum include concerts, NBA exhibition games, USF basketball and NCAA men's and women's basketball tournament games, NCAA Frozen Four games, tennis, professional wrestling, boxing, figure skating, and rodeos (as well as stand-alone bull riding events; the Forum has hosted an event by the PBR's premier tour, the Built Ford Tough Series, annually since 1998).

In 2010, the Tampa Bay Times Forum was ranked as the fourth busiest arena in the United States.

A $35 million renovation was scheduled to be completed before the 2012 Republican National Convention. The renovation included a rebuilt grand plaza entrance, elimination of 2 lower-level suites in each corner (8 of current 28 suites) leaving views from the concourse area to the playing area, renovation of each suite, elimination of sections 323 and 324 on the terrace level (574 seats) for a bar and stage area that will feature a new digital theatre organ, more concessions areas on the terrace level, an  outdoor deck and party area overlooking outside plaza and facing the downtown skyline, new climate controls that improve both the ice surface and spectator comfort, new lighting, all new padded seats, resurfaced and redecorated concourse, combining Icons and Medallions restaurants into one venue, and updated restrooms.

Also in 2012, the Tampa Bay Times Forum installed a new video display board. The board is billed as the largest of its kind in North America. In comparison, the arena's old display board measured  on all sides.

On September 3, 2014, Lightning owner Jeff Vinik announced the renaming of the Forum to Amalie Arena after coming to an agreement with Amalie Oil Company, a motor oil company based in Tampa.

Also in late 2014, the arena debuted its 1-acre organic vegetable garden to help feed players and fans. Utilizing an outside area in the back devoted to cooling pipes and recycling bins, a deck was built along with 125 hydroponic towers.

For the 2020–21 NBA season, the Toronto Raptors played their home games in Amalie Arena due to travel restrictions imposed by the Canadian government in response to the COVID-19 pandemic in Canada.

Events

NHL
As home of the Tampa Bay Lightning, Amalie Arena has hosted games in the Stanley Cup Finals, hosting games one, two, five, and seven of the 2004 Stanley Cup Finals, where the Lightning defeated the Calgary Flames four games to three to win their first Stanley Cup. During the 2015 Stanley Cup Finals against the Chicago Blackhawks, the arena was the site of games one, two, and five. Amalie Arena was also the site of games one, two, and five of the 2021 Stanley Cup Finals, where the Lightning defeated the Montreal Canadiens four games to one to win their third Stanley Cup. 

In the 2004 and 2021 Finals, the Lightning clinched the Stanley Cup on home ice at Amalie Arena. Games 3, 4 and 6 of the 2022 Stanley Cup Finals were also held at Amalie Arena; the Colorado Avalanche became the first visiting team to hoist the Stanley Cup at the arena after defeating the Lightning four games to two. It did not host the 2020 Stanley Cup Finals as all games were held behind closed doors at Edmonton's Rogers Place due to the COVID-19 pandemic. However, the eventual champion Lightning (who defeated the Dallas Stars in six games) did hold watch parties outside the arena for select season ticket holders. In addition, Amalie Arena has hosted the National Hockey League All-Star Game twice, in 1999 and in 2018.

College basketball
In college basketball, the arena is a regular host for games in both the NCAA Division I men's basketball tournament and NCAA Division I women's basketball tournament. The arena has hosted first and second-round games for the men's tournament in 2003, 2008, and 2011 (it was scheduled to host games again in 2020, only to have the tournament cancelled due to the COVID-19 pandemic). In the women's tournament, Amalie Arena has hosted the Final Four of the 2008, 2015, and 2019 tournaments. The arena has also hosted conference tournaments, hosting the 2007 ACC men's basketball tournament and the 2009 and 2022 SEC Men's Basketball Tournaments. The arena was also the main home of the South Florida Bulls men's basketball team for their 2011–12 season while the USF Sun Dome underwent extensive renovations.

AFL
During the arena's time as home of the Tampa Bay Storm of the Arena Football League, it hosted the league's championship game, known as the ArenaBowl, on two occasions, ArenaBowl XII in 1998 and ArenaBowl XVII in 2003.

Volleyball
Amalie Arena hosted the 2009 NCAA Division I women's volleyball tournament Final Four.

NBA
The arena was slated to host an NBA preseason game in 2010 between the Orlando Magic and Miami Heat, the league's two Florida teams. However, months before the game, the arena's basketball floor was treated with an oil-based cleaning solution that resulted in a slippery film forming on it. According to Magic players, the floor was so slippery that they had to walk through their shootaround. When it became apparent that there was no way to make the court playable, the game was canceled half an hour before the scheduled tipoff. All fans received a full refund.

NCAA Frozen Four
The Frozen Four of the 2012 NCAA Division I Men's Ice Hockey Tournament was held in the arena, hosted by the University of Alabama in Huntsville, the nearest collegiate hockey team to Florida. This was the first time the Frozen Four was held outside the northern US since 1999, when the University of Alaska Anchorage hosted the event at the Arrowhead Pond of Anaheim in Anaheim, California. Boston College won the national championship game 4–1 against Ferris State. Four years later, Amalie Arena again hosted the Frozen Four of the 2016 NCAA Division I Men's Ice Hockey Tournament.

Amalie Arena is scheduled to host the 2023 NCAA Division I Men's Frozen Four, 2023 NCAA Division I Women's Volleyball Championship, 2025 NCAA Division I Women's Basketball Final Four, and 2026 NCAA Division I Men's Basketball first and second rounds.

UFC, fighting, and professional wrestling
The arena held its first UFC event on April 16, 2016 for UFC on Fox: Teixeira vs. Evans. The UFC returned to the arena for UFC Fight Night: Joanna vs. Waterson on October 12, 2019.

On December 18, 2021, Amalie Arena hosted the Jake Paul vs. Tyron Woodley II boxing pay-per-view event. Paul won via KO in round 6.

It has also held the World Wrestling Federation (now renamed to WWE) pay-per-view event Survivor Series (2000), as well as Extreme Rules (2011) and Battleground (2014). Tampa hosted WrestleMania 37 in 2021 but the arena was not involved in the festivities surrounding the event, as all weekly WWE events took place in a bio-secure bubble with zero ticketed fans in attendance called the WWE ThunderDome at the time due to the COVID-19 pandemic. WrestleMania 37 itself was held at Raymond James Stadium in front of a reduced capacity audience over the course of two nights.

Other events

James Taylor has performed at Amalie Arena several times. In 2010 he performed with Carole King during the 2010 Troubadour World Reunion Tour and he has also performed with his band at Amalie Arena in 1997, 2001, 2003, 2014, 2018 and 2021 - Jackson Browne and his band opened the 2021 appearance.

British alternative rock band Coldplay performed a concert at the venue on June 28, 2012 as part of their Mylo Xyloto Tour. The show was one of their only ones on the tour that wasn't sold-out.

The arena hosted Monster Jam from 2017 to 2019.

Marvel Universe Live! kicked off its national tour at Amalie Arena on July 10, 2014.

The arena hosted AMSOIL Arenacross from 2015 to 2017. The arena hosted the Kellogg's Tour of Gymnastics Champions in 2016.

Carrie Underwood has performed in the venue multiple times with her first headlining concert on October 25, 2010 during her Play On Tour. Her latest performance was a sold-out crowd on February 4, 2023 during her Denim & Rhinestones Tour.

Gallery

See also
Downtown Tampa
List of indoor arenas in the United States
Scotiabank Arena (permanent home of the Toronto Raptors)

References

External links

 

1996 establishments in Florida
Basketball venues in Florida
College ice hockey venues in the United States
Former National Basketball Association venues
Gymnastics venues in the United States
Indoor arenas in Florida
Indoor ice hockey venues in Florida
Mixed martial arts venues in Florida
Music of Tampa, Florida
Music venues completed in 1996
Music venues in Florida
National Hockey League venues
Sports venues completed in 1996
Sports venues in Tampa, Florida
Toronto Raptors venues
Former South Florida Bulls sports venues
Tampa Bay Lightning